Ravy Dieuleriche Tsouka Dozi, known as Ravy Tsouka (born 23 December 1994) is a football player, who is playing in Belgium for Zulte Waregem. Born in France, he represents the Republic of the Congo national team.

Club career
He made his professional Serie C debut for Paganese on 14 November 2015 in a game against Ischia.

On 29 July 2022, Tsouka signed a two-year contract with an option to extend with Zulte Waregem in Belgium.

International career
He made his Congo national football team debut on 10 October 2019 in a friendly against Thailand.

References

External links
 
 

1994 births
Living people
Sportspeople from Blois
Republic of the Congo footballers
Republic of the Congo international footballers
French footballers
French sportspeople of Republic of the Congo descent
Association football defenders
F.C. Crotone players
Paganese Calcio 1926 players
Västerås SK Fotboll players
Helsingborgs IF players
S.V. Zulte Waregem players
Championnat National 2 players
Serie C players
Ettan Fotboll players
Superettan players
Allsvenskan players
Belgian Pro League players
Republic of the Congo expatriate footballers
Expatriate footballers in Italy
Expatriate footballers in Sweden
Expatriate footballers in Belgium
Footballers from Centre-Val de Loire
French expatriate sportspeople in Sweden
French expatriate sportspeople in Italy
French expatriate sportspeople in Belgium
Republic of the Congo expatriate sportspeople in Italy
Republic of the Congo expatriate sportspeople in Sweden
Republic of the Congo expatriate sportspeople in Belgium
French expatriate footballers